The 1976 Cotton Bowl Classic was a post-season college football bowl game between the co-Southwest Conference champion Arkansas Razorbacks and the Georgia Bulldogs. Arkansas defeated Georgia, 31–10 in front of 77,500 spectators.

Setting

Arkansas

Arkansas finished the regular season 9–2, came into the game on a five-game winning streak. The Hogs were part of a three-way tie for the Southwest Conference Championship with Texas and Texas A&M. The Hogs lost to Texas, 18–24, but gave #2 Texas A&M its first loss in the regular season finale. The 31-6 upset of the Aggies in War Memorial Stadium is one of the most memorable games in Razorback football history.

Georgia

Georgia was 9–2 entering the game, tied for second in the Southeastern Conference.

Game summary
The Bulldogs took an early 10–3 lead. Arkansas wouldn't score a touchdown until Georgia's QB Ray Goff tried a 'shoestring' play. He bent as if to tie his shoe and flipped the ball to Gene Washington, a legal play as long as in one motion, but Razorback Hal McAfee scooped up the ball at the 13 yard line. Ike Forte scored for the Hogs, knotting the game at 10. The two teams were scoreless in the third period, with Arkansas missing three field goals, before the Hogs exploded for 21 unanswered to close the game.

References

Cotton Bowl Classic
Cotton Bowl Classic
Arkansas Razorbacks football bowl games
Georgia Bulldogs football bowl games
January 1976 sports events in the United States
Cotton Bowl
1970s in Dallas